Howard G. Cunningham (born May 26, 1949) is an American computer programmer who developed the first wiki and was a co-author of the Manifesto for Agile Software Development. A pioneer in both design patterns and extreme programming, he started coding the WikiWikiWeb in 1994, and installed it on c2.com (the website of his software consultancy) on March 25, 1995, as an add-on to the Portland Pattern Repository. He co-authored (with Bo Leuf) a book about wikis, entitled The Wiki Way, and invented the Framework for Integrated Tests.

Cunningham was a keynote speaker at the first three instances of the WikiSym conference series on wiki research and practice, and also at the Wikimedia Developer Summit 2017.

Early life and employment
Howard G. Cunningham was born in Michigan City, Indiana, on May 26, 1949. He grew up in Highland, Indiana, staying there through high school. He received his bachelor's degree in interdisciplinary engineering (electrical engineering and computer science) and his master's degree in computer science from Purdue University, graduating in 1978. He is a co-founder of Cunningham & Cunningham, a software consultancy he started with his wife. He has also served as Director of R&D at Wyatt Software and as Principal Engineer in the Tektronix Computer Research Laboratory. He is founder of The Hillside Group and has served as program chair of the Pattern Languages of Programming conference which it sponsors. Cunningham was part of the Smalltalk community.

From December 2003 until October 2005, Cunningham worked for Microsoft in the "Patterns & Practices" group. From October 2005 to May 2007, he held the position of Director of Committer Community Development at the Eclipse Foundation. In May 2009, he joined AboutUs as its chief technology officer. On March 24, 2011 The Oregonian reported that Cunningham had departed AboutUs to join the Venice Beach-based CitizenGlobal, a startup working on crowd-sourced video content, as their chief technology officer and the Co-Creation Czar. He remains "an adviser" with AboutUs. Cunningham left CitizenGlobal and is now a programmer at New Relic.

Ideas and inventions
Cunningham is well known for a few widely disseminated ideas which he originated and developed. The most famous among these are the wiki and many ideas in the field of software design patterns, made popular by the Gang of Four (GoF). He owns the company Cunningham & Cunningham Inc., a consultancy that has specialized in object-oriented programming. He coined the concept of technical debt and expanded on the idea back in 1992. He created the site (and software) WikiWikiWeb, the first internet wiki in 1995.

When asked in a 2006 interview with internetnews.com whether he considered patenting the wiki concept, he explained that he thought the idea "just sounded like something that no one would want to pay money for."

Cunningham is interested in tracking the number and location of wiki page edits as a sociological experiment and may even consider the degradation of a wiki page as part of its process to stability. "There are those who give and those who take. You can tell by reading what they write."

In 2011, Cunningham created Smallest Federated Wiki, a tool for wiki federation, which applies aspects of software development such as forking to wiki pages. He signed the Manifesto for Agile Software Development.

Cunningham has contributed to the practice of object-oriented programming, in particular the use of pattern languages and (with Kent Beck) the class-responsibility-collaboration cards. He also contributes to the extreme programming software development methodology. Much of this work was done collaboratively on the first wiki site.

"Cunningham's Law"

Cunningham is credited with the idea: "The best way to get the right answer on the Internet is not to ask a question; it's to post the wrong answer." This refers to the observation that people are quicker to correct a wrong answer than to answer a question. According to Steven McGeady, Cunningham advised him of this on a whim in the early 1980s, and McGeady dubbed this Cunningham's Law. Although originally referring to interactions on Usenet, the law has been used to describe how other online communities work, such as Wikipedia. Cunningham himself denies ownership of the law, calling it a "misquote that disproves itself by propagating through the internet".

Personal life
Cunningham lives in Beaverton, Oregon. He holds an Amateur Radio Extra Class license issued by the Federal Communications Commission, and his call sign is K9OX.

Cunningham is Nike's first "Code for a Better World" Fellow.

Publications

See also
 Christopher Alexander – Cunningham cites Alexander's work as directly influencing his own.
 Framework for integrated test
 PatternShare
 Software design pattern

References

External links

 WikiWikiWeb, including his WikiHomePage
 2012 Dr. Dobb's Interview
 EclipseCon 2006 interview with Ward Cunningham (MP3 audio podcast, running time 20:01)
 The Microsoft patterns & practices group home page (archived)
 The Simplest Thing That Could Possibly Work (2004 interview)
 "The Web's wizard of working together" – profile originally in The Oregonian, December 19, 2005
 You can look it up: The Wikipedia story – excerpt from the 2014 book The Innovators

1949 births
Living people
21st-century American non-fiction writers
Amateur radio people
American computer programmers
American technology writers
Extreme programming
People from Beaverton, Oregon
Writers from Portland, Oregon
Purdue University College of Engineering alumni
Technology evangelists
Tektronix people
Wikimedia Foundation Advisory Board members
People from Highland, Lake County, Indiana
Microsoft employees
Articles containing video clips
Agile software development
Software design patterns